Gloria Sawai (20 December 1932 – 20 July 2011), born Gloria Ruth Ostrem in Minneapolis, Minnesota, was an American-born fiction author, based in Edmonton, Alberta, Canada. She died on 20 July 2011.

In early childhood, she moved with her family to Saskatchewan, then in her youth to Alberta. Her father was a Lutheran minister.

Education
 1948: Camrose Lutheran College (today the University of Alberta Augustana Faculty) (Camrose, Alberta).
 October 2003: Received Distinguished Alumni Award
 1953: Bachelor of Arts, Augsburg College (Minneapolis, Minnesota)
 1977: Master of Fine Arts, University of Montana (Missoula, Montana)

Awards and recognition
 fiction winner, Governor General's Award, A Song for Nettie Johnson, 2002
 Danuta Gleed Literary Award: A Song for Nettie Johnson, Coteau Books, for the year 2001

Works
 1983: contributor, Three Times Five: Short Stories (NeWest) 
 2001: A Song for Nettie Johnson (Coteau) 
 2002 reissue:

References

External links
 Coteau Books: author profiles, including Gloria Sawai, Retrieved 17 July 2006
 The Canadian Encyclopedia: Gloria Sawai, Retrieved 17 July 2006
  , p. 8 "Sawai will be special guest", Retrieved 17 July 2006
 

1932 births
2011 deaths
American expatriate writers in Canada
Christian writers
Writers from Edmonton
Writers from Minneapolis
Governor General's Award-winning fiction writers
University of Montana alumni
Canadian women novelists
20th-century Canadian novelists
21st-century Canadian novelists
20th-century Canadian women writers
21st-century Canadian women writers